In the mathematical field of graph theory, a distance-regular graph is a regular graph such that for any two vertices  and , the number of vertices at distance  from  and at distance  from  depends only upon , , and the distance between  and .

Some authors exclude the complete graphs and disconnected graphs from this definition.

Every distance-transitive graph is distance-regular.  Indeed, distance-regular graphs were introduced as a combinatorial generalization of distance-transitive graphs, having the numerical regularity properties of the latter without necessarily having a large automorphism group.

Intersection arrays

The array of integers characterizing a distance-regular graph is known as its intersection array.

Cospectral distance-regular graphs 
A pair of connected distance-regular graphs are cospectral if and only if they have the same intersection array.

A distance-regular graph is disconnected if and only if it is a disjoint union of cospectral distance-regular graphs.

Properties

Suppose  is a connected distance-regular graph of valency  with intersection array .

Graph-theoretic properties 
  for all .

Spectral properties 
 has  distinct eigenvalues.

Examples

Some first examples of distance-regular graphs include:
 The complete graphs.
 The cycles graphs. 
 The odd graphs. 
 The Moore graphs. 
 The collinearity graph of a regular near polygon.
 The Wells graph and the Sylvester graph.
 
 Strongly regular graphs of diameter .

Classification of distance-regular graphs 
There are only finitely many distinct connected distance-regular graphs of any given valency .

Similarly, there are only finitely many distinct connected distance-regular graphs with any given eigenvalue multiplicity  (with the exception of the complete multipartite graphs).

Cubic distance-regular graphs 
The cubic distance-regular graphs have been completely classified.

The 13 distinct cubic distance-regular graphs are K4 (or Tetrahedral graph), K3,3, the Petersen graph, the Cubical graph, the Heawood graph, the Pappus graph, the Coxeter graph, the Tutte–Coxeter graph, the Dodecahedral graph, the Desargues graph, Tutte 12-cage, the Biggs–Smith graph, and the Foster graph.

References

Further reading
  

Algebraic graph theory
Graph families
Regular graphs